Thommie Lars Rudolf Bergman (born December 10, 1947) is a Swedish retired ice hockey player.

He played for the Detroit Red Wings in the National Hockey League (NHL) and the Winnipeg Jets in the World Hockey Association (WHA). In Sweden he played for IFK Munkfors, KB Karlskoga, Västra Frölunda HC and Södertälje SK.

He competed as a member of the Sweden men's national ice hockey team at the 1972 Winter Olympics held in Japan.

Bergman now lives in Stockholm, Sweden, where he works as a scout for the Toronto Maple Leafs.

Career statistics

References

External links
 

1947 births
Detroit Red Wings players
Frölunda HC players
Ice hockey players at the 1972 Winter Olympics
Living people
Olympic ice hockey players of Sweden
Sportspeople from Värmland County
Södertälje SK players
Swedish ice hockey defencemen
Toronto Maple Leafs scouts
Undrafted National Hockey League players
Winnipeg Jets (WHA) players